HeliRussia is Russia's first International exhibition of Helicopter Industry held in Moscow, Russia at Crocus Expo exhibition center. The first show, HeliRussia 2008, was held on May 15–17 2008.

The world achievements in helicopter industry were demonstrated in all aspects, from design to manufacture and operation, on 10 thousand square meter area of the exhibition pavilions and open platforms. Prominent Russian companies like the Mil Moscow Helicopter Plant, Kamov, Kazan Helicopter Plant, Rostvertol, RET Krondshtadt,  as well as representative offices of Eurocopter, Bell Helicopter Textron and other companies participated in HeliRussia 2008.

HeliRussia is an important event in Russian business. The ongoing economic boom in Russia and the growth in paying capacity of the Russian organizations and individuals provide for the steady growth in demand for helicopter-related services.

The exhibition was held by the Russian Helicopter Industry Association with the support of the RF Federal Industrial Agency, the  United Industrial Corporation Oboronprom and OJSC Helicopters of Russia.

References

External links

Official Russian Helicopter Industry Association site in Russian

Air shows
Trade fairs in Russia
Aviation in Russia
Events in Moscow